The  Los Angeles Kiss season was the franchise's first season in the Arena Football League (AFL). The team was coached by Bob McMillen and played their home games at the Honda Center.

In their inaugural season, the Kiss did well at the box office, finishing second in the AFL (behind Tampa Bay) in attendance, drawing 98,505 fans to nine home games (or 10,945 per game). On the field, though, it was a different story: after winning two of their first three games, LA managed just one victory thereafter, finishing 3–15 and missing the playoffs.

Offseason

2013 dispersal draft

Notes
 Los Angeles traded their first-round selection to Iowa in exchange for quarterback J. J. Raterink.

Roster changes

Regular season

Schedule
The Kiss began the season on the road against the San Antonio Talons on March 15. Their final regular season game was on July 26, on the road against the Jacksonville Sharks.

Standings

Staff

Roster

References

Los Angeles Kiss
Los Angeles Kiss seasons
Los Angeles Kiss